Bjørn Borgen Hasløv (born 18 May 1941) is a retired Danish rower. Together with Erik Petersen, Kurt Helmudt and John Hansen he won a gold medal at the 1964 Summer Olympics and a silver medal at the 1964 European Championships in the coxless fours event.

References

1941 births
Living people
Danish male rowers
Olympic rowers of Denmark
Rowers at the 1964 Summer Olympics
Olympic gold medalists for Denmark
Olympic medalists in rowing
Medalists at the 1964 Summer Olympics
European Rowing Championships medalists
Rowers from Copenhagen